Notable people with the family name Detmold include:
 Christian Edward Detmold (1810–1887), German-American engineer; younger brother of William Ludwig Detmold
 Edward Julius Detmold (1883–1957) and his twin brother, Charles Maurice Detmold (1883–1908), English illustrators
 Henry Detmold (1854–1924), English painter
 William Ludwig Detmold, (1808–1894), German-American orthopedic surgeon; older brother of Christian Edward Detmold
 William Detmold, (1828–1884), German-American-Australian bookbinder, printer and stationer

Nobility (House of Lippe)
Frederick Adolphus, Count of Lippe-Detmold (1667–1718), father of Simon Henry Adolph
Simon August, Count of Lippe-Detmold (1727–1782), son of Simon Henry Adolph
Simon Henry Adolph, Count of Lippe-Detmold (1694–1734), son of Frederick Adolphus, father of Simon August

German-language surnames
Toponymic surnames